Michael and Mary is a 1931 British drama film directed by Victor Saville and starring Elizabeth Allan, Edna Best, Frank Lawton, and Herbert Marshall. This was the first of the Edna Best and Herbert Marshall co-starring talkies. It was based on a play of the same name by A.A. Milne. Milne's story was adapted by Lajos Bíró,Robert Stevenson and Angus MacPhail. Produced by Gainsborough Pictures, it was shot at the company's Islington Studios in London. The film's sets were designed by the art director Alex Vetchinsky.

The play was first performed on 13 December 1929 at the Charles Hopkins Theatre in New York. It starred Henry Hull, Edith Barrett and Harry Beresford. It then transferred to the St James's Theatre in London's West End.

Plot
A young bride (Edna Best) is deserted by her husband (D. A. Clarke-Smith) but finds happiness with another man (Herbert Marshall). They contract a bigamous marriage for the sake of their child (Frank Lawton).

The first husband turns up and starts black-mailing them. During a quarrel with the second husband, he dies. After some complications, their son learns the truth, but stands by them.

Cast
 Herbert Marshall as Michael Rowe
 Edna Best as 	Mary Rowe
 Frank Lawton as 	David Rowe
 Elizabeth Allan as 	Romo
 D.A. Clarke-Smith as Harry Price
 Ben Field as Tullivant
 Margaret Yarde as Mrs. Tullivant
 Sunday Wilshin as 	Violet Cunliffe

Reception
The film was voted the third best British movie of 1932. With a shortened running time of 76 minutes, it was distributed in America by Universal Pictures.

Radio adaptation
Michael and Mary was presented on Hollywood Sound Stage 20 March 1952. The 30-minute adaptation starred Deborah Kerr and Herbert Marshall.

References

Bibliography
 Cook, Pam. Gainsborough Pictures. Cassell, 1997.
 Low, Rachael. Filmmaking in 1930s Britain. George Allen & Unwin, 1985.
 Wood, Linda. British Films, 1927-1939. British Film Institute, 1986.

External links 
 

1931 films
1931 drama films
British black-and-white films
Films based on works by A. A. Milne
Films directed by Victor Saville
British drama films
1930s English-language films
1930s British films
Gainsborough Pictures films
British films based on plays
Islington Studios films
Universal Pictures films